The 2022 IIHF World Championship Final decided the winner of the be 2022 IIHF World Championship. It was played at the Tampere Deck Arena in Tampere, Finland on 29 May 2022.

Finland and Canada faced each other for the third consecutive time in the finals, and sixth overall. Finland won in 2019, while Canada prevailed in 2021. Finland took the win with a 4–3 overtime win.

Road to the final

Match

References

External links
Official website

Final
IIHF World Championship Final
2022
2022 IIHF World Championship Final